Carabus hummeli hummeli is a subspecies of ground beetle from family Carabidae, found in Mongolia and Russia. They are black coloured with blue pronotum.

References

hummeli hummeli
Beetles described in 1823